Ganga Meri Maa is a 1983 Indian Hindi language action - thriller film, stars Shatrughan Sinha, Neetu Singh, Amjad Khan, Danny Denzongpa, Nirupa Roy, Sujit Kumar, Madan Puri and Ranjeet. The music is by R. D. Burman.

Synopsis 
The film traces the journey of Ganga (Nirupa Roy), a tragedy-struck widow and how she reunites with her long-lost sons and to avenge the death of her husband.

Cast 
 Shatrughan Sinha as Ram
 Neetu Singh as Neetu
 Nirupa Roy as Ganga
 Amjad Khan as Mohan
 Danny Denzongpa as Malang
 Sujit Kumar as Prakash
 Madan Puri as Roopa Daku / Roopchand
 Ranjeet as Ranjeet
 Paintal as Allah Rakha

Soundtrack
All songs are written by Gulshan Bawra. The soundtrack is available on Polydor Music India Ltd. now (Universal Music India).

References

External links 
 
 

1980s Hindi-language films
1983 films
Films scored by R. D. Burman